The shade maize or corn refers to a specific tone of yellow; it is named for the cereal of the same name—maize (called corn in the United States and Canada).  In public usage, maize can be applied to a variety of shades, ranging from light yellow to a dark shade that borders on orange, since the color of maize (the actual corn) may vary.

The first recorded use of maize as a color name in English was in 1861.

Usage
Biology
 "Light maize in color, this wildflower is found only now and then in our area, and treasured for its rarity. The three clumps, two near the east fence under a thriving red-stemmed dogwood and one beside a weathered stump, gave us a thrill last spring with their first buds."
Chemistry
 "For slow cases, one can use the method... in which a solution of thymol blue has had its pH value adjusted so that it is maize in color and any slight increase in the acidity will make the solution turn blue."
Sports
 Maize is one of the two colors used by the University of Michigan Wolverines (the other being blue) although the actual shade of yellow used has varied over time; however, it always approaches the color of corn.  The athletic colors of Carleton College are also maize and blue.

See also
List of colors

References